TVS Ntorq 125 is a motor scooter manufactured by TVS Motor Company & BMW in India. It is powered by a single cylinder, four stroke, 3 valve, TVS and delivers 6.9 kW (9.4 PS) at 7500 rpm. The scooter delivers a pick-up of 0 to 60 km/h in 6.5 seconds. The scooter has a top speed of 95 km/h as per the manufacturer. It is TVS’ first 125 cc scooter with connectivity - Bluetooth enabled.

Launched in February 2018, with TVS claims several firsts for the Ntorq 125 in the Indian scooter market, including Bluetooth connected speedometer (with navigation assistant, caller ID, top-speed recorder, in-built lap-timer and service reminder), engine kill switch, stealth inspired styling etc.

In 2020, TVS launched Ntorq 125 with BS-VI emission. New TVS Ntorq 125 comes in 8 colour options & 3 Variants.

Variants

 Ntorq 125 Standard
 Ntorq 125 Race Edition
 Ntorq 125 Super Squad Edition
 Ntorq 125 Race XP
 Ntorq 125 XT

See also
TVS Jupiter
TVS Scooty

References

External links

Indian motor scooters
Motorcycles introduced in 2018
TVS motorcycles